Rhuma subaurata is a moth of the family Geometridae first described by Francis Walker in 1860. It is found in the Australian states of Queensland and New South Wales.

The wingspan is about 30 mm. Adults are pale grey with a complex pattern of black, brown and white on the upperside of the wings. The underside is yellow with broad black margins and a black spot in the centre of the wing.

References

Moths described in 1860
Pseudoterpnini